Murakovo is a rural locality (a village) in Denisovskoye Rural Settlement, Gorokhovetsky District, Vladimir Oblast, Russia. The population was 5 as of 2010.

Geography 
Murakovo is located on the Singer Lake, 19 km southwest of Gorokhovets (the district's administrative centre) by road. Malaya Karpovka is the nearest rural locality.

References 

Rural localities in Gorokhovetsky District